Don Luca c'è is an Italian television series. It is the sequel of Don Luca.

Cast

Luca Laurenti: Don Luca
Nora Amile: Barista
Stefano Chiodaroli: Angelo
Gianluca Fubelli: Crocifisso
Valeria Graci: Laura

See also
List of Italian television series

Italian television series